Deck lock is one of several systems for automatically securing rotorcraft on the Helicopter decks of small ships.

A deck lock system was in use by the Royal Navy with its Westland Lynx aircraft, and presently with its AgustaWestland AW159 Wildcat helicopters.

References

Aviation ground support equipment